The 2022 Central American and Caribbean Beach Games (Spanish: Juegos Centroamericanos y de Caribe de Mar y Playa), officially the I Central American and Caribbean Beach Games, was an international multi-sport event held in Santa Marta, Colombia from November 19–26. It was the first time this event was realised.  The games are overseen by Centro Caribe Sports (formerly CACSO).

Participating teams
26 nations and dependencies competed in these Beach Games.

Below is a list of all the participating NOCs. The number of competitors per delegation is indicated in brackets.

Sports

Medal table

References

External links
 Official site

Central American and Caribbean Beach Games
Central American and Caribbean Beach Games
Central American and Caribbean Beach Games
Multi-sport events in Colombia
International sports competitions hosted by Colombia